Eddie Tracey (born 16 July 1923) was an Australian professional rugby league footballer who played in the 1940s.

Playing career
Tracey played his junior rugby league for St Joseph's College and played reserve grade for Canterbury in 1942 and 1943 and later enlisted in the Royal Australian Air Force during World War II.  In 1946, Tracey made his first grade debut for Canterbury against Sydney Roosters.  In the same season, Canterbury fell short of a grand final appearance as they were defeated by Wests Tigers in the preliminary final.  

The following year, Tracey played at centre in Canterbury's 13-9 grand final defeat by Wests Tigers at the Sydney Sports Ground.  In 1948, Tracey was selected to play for New South Wales and featured in one game.  Tracey was also selected to play for Australia on tour but made no appearances due to injury. In 1949, due to the residency rules at the time, Tracey was not allowed to play for Canterbury and switched to play for South Sydney Rabbitohs.  Tracey only spent half the year with Souths before switching back to Canterbury mid season and retired at the end of 1949.

References

1923 births
Possibly living people
South Sydney Rabbitohs players
Canterbury-Bankstown Bulldogs players
New South Wales rugby league team players
Australian rugby league players
Rugby league players from Sydney
Rugby league centres
Royal Australian Air Force personnel of World War II